Angela Kaye Witwer is a Democratic member of the Michigan House of Representatives.

Before being elected to the state legislature, Witwer co-founded Edge Partnership, a public relations, marketing, and advocacy group.

References

External links 
 Angela Witwer at housedems.com

21st-century American politicians
21st-century American women politicians
Democratic Party members of the Michigan House of Representatives
Living people
Women state legislators in Michigan
Year of birth missing (living people)